Ebba Grön 1978–1982 is a 1987 compilation album by Swedish punk band Ebba Grön. It was released as a farewell album for their fans, and is one of the all-time best selling records in Sweden. The booklet contains a copy of the letter the band sent to the national news agency Tidningarnas Telegrambyrå when they split.

Track listing

 Profit (02:01)
 Ung & Sänkt (01:53)
 Tyst För Fan	(02:29)
 Mona Tumbas Slim Club	(02:27)
 Vad Skall Du Bli (02:36)	
 Häng Gud (02:05)
 We're Only in It for the Drugs (04:23)
 Totalvägra (01:50)	
 Beväpna Er (03:23)	
 Det Måste Vara Radion	(02:09)
 Pervers Politiker (02:05)
 Staten & Kapitalet (05:26)
 Ung & Kåt (03:07)
 800° (03:51)	
 Mamma Pappa Barn (02:57)
 Mental Istid (03:03)	
 Scheisse (03:10)	
 Flyktsoda (03:55)
 Uppgång & Fall (03:40)
 Die Mauer (04:03)
 Tittar På TV (05:27)
 Nu Släckas Tusen Människoliv (03:03)

References

1987 compilation albums
Ebba Grön albums